Andrea Nicolle Amaya Villalta (born 16 February 2003) is a Salvadoran footballer who plays as a defender for Mexican Liga MX Femenil club Atlas FC and the El Salvador women's national team.

Club career
Amaya has played for Alianza FC and AD Chalatenango in El Salvador.

International career
Amaya represented El Salvador at the 2020 CONCACAF Women's U-20 Championship. She made her senior debut on 8 April 2021.

See also
List of El Salvador women's international footballers

References

External links
 
 
 

2003 births
Living people
Sportspeople from San Salvador
Salvadoran women's footballers
Women's association football defenders
Alianza F.C. footballers
Atlas F.C. (women) footballers
Liga MX Femenil players
El Salvador women's international footballers
Salvadoran expatriate footballers
Salvadoran expatriate sportspeople in Mexico
Expatriate women's footballers in Mexico